The following is a timeline of the presidency of Joe Biden during the first quarter of 2022, from January 1 to March 31, 2022. To navigate between quarters, see timeline of the Joe Biden presidency.

Timeline

January 2022

February 2022

March 2022

See also
 Presidential transition of Joe Biden
 List of executive actions by Joe Biden
 List of presidential trips made by Joe Biden (international trips)
 Timeline of the 2020 United States presidential election

References

2022 Q1
Presidency of Joe Biden
January 2022 events in the United States
February 2022 events in the United States
March 2022 events in the United States
Political timelines of the 2020s by year
2022 timelines
Articles containing video clips